KMRD-LP is a listener-supported, Low Power FM, independent community radio station licensed to Madrid, New Mexico, serving Madrid, Los Cerrillos, and Southern Santa Fe County.  KMRD-LP was founded as a project of the Madrid Cultural Projects in 2013. KMRD is now is owned and operated by KMRD Inc. KMRD volunteers installed transmission equipment with the help of the Prometheus Radio Project in 2014.

References

External links
 Madrid Community Radio Online
 

2014 establishments in New Mexico
Variety radio stations in the United States
Radio stations established in 2014
MRD-LP
MRD-LP
Community radio stations in the United States